A brig is a type of sailing ship. 

Brig may also refer to:

In the military
 Brig, a (chiefly American) term for a naval military prison on a ship or navy base
 An abbreviation for the rank of brigadier
 An abbreviation for a brigade

Places
 Brig-Glis (also known simply as "Brig"), a town in the canton of Valais, Switzerland
 Brig (district), the district in which Brig, Switzerland is located
 Brig railway station, serving Brig, Switzerland
 Brig Bahnhofplatz railway station, the station in Brig used by metre-gauge trains
 Bamber Bridge, a town in Lancashire, England, often referred to as "Brig" by residents
 Brig, Croatia, a village near Vižinada

Arts and entertainment
 The Brig (play), a 1963 play by Kenneth H. Brown
 "The Brig" (Lost), an episode of the TV series Lost
 The Brig, a nickname of the Doctor Who character Brigadier Lethbridge-Stewart

People
 Brigman Brig Owens (born 1943), American former National Football League player
 Brig Van Osten, American hairstylist who won the reality TV series Shear Genius (season 3)

Other uses
 Brig, another name for the Celtic goddess Brigid
 An obsolete abbreviation for a brigantine, a type of sailing ship
 Scots for bridge, Brig o' Doon, Cramond Brig.

See also
 Brig sloop
 Hermaphrodite brig
 Brigg, North Lincolnshire, England, a town
 Brigg (UK Parliament constituency), a former constituency centred on the town
 Kane Brigg (born 1988), Australian retired high jumper and triple jumper